EZO is the American self-titled debut album from the Japanese metal band Ezo. It was released in 1987 on Geffen Records and co-produced by Gene Simmons of KISS fame. Songwriters from the Kiss' entourage, such as Adam Mitchell and Jaime St. James, contributed heavily to the songs of the album. Jody Gray, co-writer of the song "Destroyer", co-wrote and co-produced the band's second album, Fire Fire.

Track listing
Side one
"House of 1,000 Pleasures" (EZO, Jaime St. James) – 5:07
"Flashback Heart Attack" (James Christian, Susan Deicicchi) – 4:07
"Mr. Midnight" (Shoyo Iida, St. James) – 4:22
"Here It Comes" (Taro Takahashi, Adam Mitchell) – 3:14
"I Walk Alone" (Takahashi, Mitchell) – 3:36

Side two
"Destroyer" (Takahashi, Jody Gray, Mark Brotter, Mitchell) – 4:27
"Big Changes" (Brock Walsh) – 3:52
"Kiss of Fire" (EZO, Mitchell) – 3:25
"Desiree" (Iida, Mitchell) – 3:27

Personnel 
Band members
Masaki Yamada – vocals
Shoyo Iida – guitar
Taro Takahashi – bass
Hirotsugu Homma – drums

Additional musicians
Kip Winger - background vocals

Production
Gene Simmons - producer
Val Garay - producer, engineer, mixing
Richard Bosworth, Bob Levy, Cliff Jones - assistant engineers
Stephen Marcussen - mastering

Charts

References

1987 debut albums
Albums produced by Val Garay
Albums produced by Gene Simmons
Geffen Records albums